The Go Set are a five-piece punk rock band, which were formed in 2003 in Geelong by founding mainstays, Justin Keenan, on vocals and guitar, and Mark Moran on bass guitar. By 2017 they had released seven studio albums and toured Australia, Europe, New Zealand and Japan.

History 

The Go Set were formed in Geelong in 2003 by lead singer-songwriter and guitarist, Justin Keenan, and bass guitarist, Mark Moran. Keenan is the owner of Karvin Records, which is a Melbourne-based talent management, PR company and record label. He had been a member of Melbourne-based garage rockers, Eddie Would Go, which formed in 1996 and released three albums before disbanding in 2001.

Their debut album, Sing a Song of Revolution (2005), was produced by Lindsay Gravina at Melbourne's Birdland Studios. This album fuses traditional folk influences with 1970s punk rock. Shite 'n' Onions Will Swan observed, "[they] first marched into view, all bagpipes and tattered banners and bandaged heads held high, with 2005’s Sing a Song of Revolution, an exciting and accessible collection of emigrant anthems and mandolin-spiked drinking music."

The Go Set's second album, The Hungry Mile (2006), was produced by Radio Birdman front man Rob Younger. It provided the singles "Davey", "Union Man" and "Power of Youth". Alongside Keenan and Moran, the line-up was Andrew Baxter on guitar and mandolin, Ben Cuthbert on drums, and Johnny "Rotten" McHaggis on bagpipes. From March to June the group undertook their Hungry Mile Tour across Australia and to New Zealand.

In November 2011 The Go Set worked with Australian rock producer Paul McKercher on their 6th album, recorded at Hothouse Studios in St Kilda, Melbourne. The self-titled album features the single 'Drums of Chelsea' and was released in March 2012. In the following month Keenan told Chris Yates of The Music, of their proposed tour, "If you said to any other musician, you're going to Europe for a month, you're playing every night, you're playing eight different countries, you're playing at five festivals where you're gonna be playing to thousands of people, dudes would be climbing over each other to get on that flight!"

During August 2013 they supported a tour by the Real McKenzies, with BMAs Rory McCartney observing, "[their] fusion of punk with bagpipes, kilts, tin whistles, and even a mandolin might seem an odd mix... [however] the five-piece has had 13 different members over the years. Touring takes its toll on families and the band has a revolving line-up." McCartney reflected on the group's song writing, "Like its sound, the band's lyrical material has also been heavily influenced by the members' heritage. Keenan's parents were very left-leaning. This made him serious about music and wanting to leave a legacy people could connect to, one that rises above popular culture."

Members 

Current members
 Justin Keenan - Vocals, guitar
 Brendon “Shorty” Lee - Bass
 Lachlan McSwain - Bagpipes, tin whistle
 Joel Colliver - Guitar
 Tommy Collins - Guitar, mandolin, upright bass
 Troy Scott - Drums

Former members
 Fidel (Paul) Monk - Guitar, mandolin
 Andrew Baxter-Smith - Guitar, mandolin
 Jesse Beaton -  Guitar, mandolin
 Mark McCartney -  Guitar, mandolin
 Lee Hartney - Guitar
 Ben Cuthbet -  Drums
 Dave Foley -  Drums
 Chris Cowburn - Drums
 Mark Moran -  Bass
 Tom Fisher -  Bass
 Evan Young -  Bass
 Johnny -  Bagpipes
 Tommy Collins - Upright bass, guitar
 Chad Blaster - Drums

Discography

Studio albums

Extended plays

Live albums 

Another Round in Melbourne Town (2010)

References

External links
 
 Brad West. "Crime, Suicide and the Anti-Hero: "Waltzing Matilda" in Australia". Journal of Popular Culture. 353 (winter 2001). 127 - 141.
 The Go Set on Triple J Unearthed

Victoria (Australia) musical groups
Australian punk rock groups
Celtic punk groups
Musical groups from Geelong